Nonny Hogrogian (born May 7, 1932) is an Armenian-American writer and illustrator, known best for children's picture books.  She has won two annual Caldecott Medals for U.S. children's book illustrations.  Since childhood she prefers folk and fairy tales, poetry, fantasy and stories.

Biography
Hogrogian was born in New York City to parents born in Armenia.  Her parents were amateur painters and her sister became an interior designer.  Hogrogian earned a B.A. in Fine Arts from Hunter College in 1953. Afterward, Hogrogian worked as a book designer at Thomas Y. Crowell Co.; studied with Antonio Frasconi and Hodaka Yoshida, and studied art at the New School.  In 1960, Crowell published her first works in the book, King of the Kerry Fair, by Nicolete Meredith, which Hogrogian illustrated with woodcuts.  Subsequently she has worked as a designer at Holt and Scribner's and as a freelance illustrator.

In 1971 Hogrogian married David Kherdian, a writer and editor. For two years they lived in Lyme Center, New Hampshire, where he was the state "poet-in-the-schools."  The state university library is one repository for their works (in a joint collection).  Hogrogian has illustrated some of his poetic anthologies and other works for publication.

Awards
Hogrogian won the Caldecott Medal for illustration in 1966 and 1972.  The American Library Association award annually recognizes the previous year's "most distinguished American picture book for children".  Always Room for One More was written by Sorche Nic Leodhas and published by Holt, Rinehart and Winston in 1965. One Fine Day, an old Armenian tale that she retold and illustrated, was published by Macmillan US in 1971.

Hogrogian received a Caldecott Honor in 1977 for The Contest, another story she retold and illustrated.

Works

Books
Always Room for One More
Cool Cat
The Contest
One Fine Day
Ghosts Go Haunting (Illustrator)

References

External links

 
 Always room for one more (first edition), Library of Congress Catalog Record
 One fine day (first edition), LC Catalog Record
 

1932 births
American children's writers
American women illustrators
American children's book illustrators
Caldecott Medal winners
American people of Armenian descent
Hunter College alumni
Writers from New York City
Living people
21st-century American women